Spanier means "man from Spain" in German and, as a surname, may refer to:

 Edwin Henry Spanier (1921–1996), American mathematician known for the Alexander-Spanier cohomology theory
 Graham Spanier (born 1948), former president of Penn State University
 Muggsy Spanier (1906–1967), American jazz musician
 Wolfgang Spanier (1943–2018), German politician, member of the Bundestag
 Nicolina Dijjers Spanier (born 1909), real name of screen actress Lien Deyers

Surnames